USS Sentry (MCM-3), an  mine countermeasures ship, is the second U.S. Navy ship of that name. Sentry was laid down on 8 October 1984 by Peterson Builders in Sturgeon Bay, Wisconsin; launched on 20 September 1986 and commissioned on 2 September 1989.

In 1993, Sentry made a 6-month cruise to Europe, joining the Standing Naval Force Channel and participating in exercise Blue Harrier, in the Baltic Sea. The ship visited Key West, Norfolk, Bermuda, Azores, Oostende, Kiel, Aarhus, Brest, St Malo, La Rochelle, Vigo, Cadiz, Porto, Lisbon, and Gibraltar during this deployment.

Her homeport is Naval Base San Diego.

On 15 March 2012, the U.S. Navy announced USS Sentry would be one of four minesweepers moved to the Persian Gulf region.

References

External links 
 
 navsource.org: USS Sentry

 

Avenger-class mine countermeasures ships
Minehunters of the United States
1986 ships
Ships built by Peterson Builders